Gratton is an English locational surname, a variant of Gradon.

Notable people with this surname
Hockey players
 Chris Gratton (born 1975), Canadian professional ice hockey player
 Benoît Gratton (born 1976), Canadian ice hockey forward
 Gilles Gratton (born 1952), Canadian ice hockey goaltender
 Josh Gratton (born 1982), Canadian professional ice hockey left wing
 Norm Gratton (born 1950), Canadian professional right wing
Others
 Frank Lymer Gratton (1871–1946), Australian choral conductor and educator
 Hector Gratton (born 1900), Canadian composer
 Lynda Gratton (born 1953), British psychologist and management academic
 Sarah Gratton (born 1966), British film producer, author and former actress

Fiction
 Bob 'Elvis' Gratton, the subject of multiple films and a 1980s television series of the same name by Quebec director Pierre Falardeau 
 Bob Gratton: Ma Vie My life, Québécois sitcom television series in 2007

References

English toponymic surnames